Mendon Township is a township in Clayton County, Iowa, USA.  As of the 2000 census, its population was 1,890.

Geography
According to the USGS, it contains ten cemeteries: Baylis, Buell Park, Eastman, First Evangelical Lutheran, Knapp, Moody, Pleasant Grove, Point Ann, Saint Marys Catholic and Walton.

The streams of Bloody Run and North Cedar Creek run through this township.

References
 USGS Geographic Names Information System (GNIS)

External links
 US-Counties.com
 City-Data.com

Townships in Clayton County, Iowa
Townships in Iowa